John Carlin (1878 – 1935) was an English footballer who played as a striker for Liverpool in The Football League. He made his debut for Liverpool during the 1902–3 season, replacing the injured Sam Raybould in what was his only appearance of the season. During his four years at the club he appeared sporadically failing to claim a regular place in the team. He would later play for Preston North End.

References

1878 births
1935 deaths
English footballers
Liverpool F.C. players
Preston North End F.C. players
English Football League players
Association football forwards
Tranmere Rovers F.C. players
Footballers from Southport
Barnsley F.C. players